Tribromoacetic acid is the chemical compound with the formula CBr3CO2H. It is one of the haloacetic acids, but much less encountered and used than the closely related trichloroacetic and trifluoroacetic acids.

References 

Acetic acids
Tribromomethyl compounds
Organic compounds with 2 carbon atoms